Lee David Collins (born 10 September 1977) is an English former footballer who played for Stoke City.

Career
Collins  was born in Birmingham started his football career back in 1995 with Aston Villa as a trainee. He moved to Stoke City in the summer of 1998. At Stoke, Collins made four appearances in 1998–99 but struggled to become a regular and spent the 1999–2000 season on loan at Cambridge United. He failed to make an appearance for Cambridge and after one FA Cup match in 2000–01 he was released by the club. He has spent the bulk of his career at Moor Green and stayed with them when the merged to form Solihull Moors where he was club captain. Collins moved to Hinckley United in July 2009.

Personal life
He graduated from the University of Salford in 2007 with a degree in Physiotherapy

Career statistics
Source:

A.  The "Other" column constitutes appearances and goals in the Football League Trophy.

References

External links
 

1977 births
Living people
English footballers
Aston Villa F.C. players
Hinckley United F.C. players
Solihull Moors F.C. players
Stoke City F.C. players
Cambridge United F.C. players
Moor Green F.C. players
Alumni of the University of Salford
English Football League players
Association football defenders